PBG SA is a Polish engineering company which is engaged in design, execution and repair of pipelines and equipment for the transport of oil, natural gas, water and waste water, infrastructure for heating and fuel storage facilities.

See also
List of petroleum companies

References

External links
 http://www.pbg-sa.pl/en/
 http://www.inwestortv.pl/kanal/pbg.html Investor TV - the official television channel, enterprise-PBG

Engineering companies of Poland